Trzęsacz  is a village in the administrative district of Gmina Rewal, within Gryfice County, West Pomeranian Voivodeship, in north-western Poland.

For the history of the region, see History of Pomerania.

The village has a population of 89. It is a tourist center, famous for its ancient church, which has been reduced over the ages to a lone southern wall.

Notable residents
Jacob Heinrich von Flemming (1667–1728), military officer and politician

References

External links

Polish
 
 A page about the church, together with historical photos

German

Photographs
 Church in Trzesacz, 1870
 A photo of the church, 1909
 Church in 1935
 Ruins of the church, around 1970
 Last remaining wall, 2000s
 

Villages in Gryfice County